The Importance of Being Earnest is a 1992 American film adaptation of the 1895 play of the same name by Oscar Wilde, featuring an all-black cast.

Director Kurt Baker co-wrote the screenplay with Peter Anthony Andrews, retaining most of Wilde’s dialogue and the setting around London, but moving it to the (then) present day rather than the original’s late Victorian period.
The film was produced by Nancy Carter Crow, who is also married to the director, and shot completely within the couple’s home in Brentwood, Los Angeles.
It premiered in October 1991 at a Harvard University film symposium, "Blacks in Black & White and Color",
and opened theatrically on May 14, 1992, at the Anthology Film Archives.

Cast 

 Obba Babatundé as Lane
 Wren T. Brown as Algernon Moncrieff 
 Chris Calloway  as Gwendolen Fairfax 
 Lanei Chapman as Cecily Cardew
 Sylvester Hayes as butler
 Barbara Isaacs as Merriman
 Brock Peters as Doctor Chasuble
 CCH Pounder as Miss Prism
 Daryl Roach as Jack Worthing
 Ann Weldon as Lady Bracknell

Reception 

Stephen Holden, writing for The New York Times, found that the film "deserves credit for breaking new ground", but lamented its technical quality, describing it as "just one step more sophisticated than a crude home movie".

References

External links 
 
 
 
 
 

American films based on plays
Films set in London
Films shot in Los Angeles
Films based on The Importance of Being Earnest
1992 comedy films
1992 films
1990s English-language films